The Torrens state by-election, 1994 was a by-election held on 7 May 1994 for the South Australian House of Assembly seat of Torrens, centred in the inner north-eastern suburbs of Adelaide. This was triggered by the death of Liberal MHA Joe Tiernan on 31 March 1994, only four months after winning the seat at its first contest in the 1993 state election on a two-party vote of 56.22 percent.

Timeline 
 31 March 1994
Tiernan died, vacating the seat of Torrens.

 10 April 1994
Writ of election issued by Speaker of the House of Assembly.

 22 April 1994, at noon
Close of nominations and ballot paper order draw conducted.

 7 May 1994
Polling day, between the hours of 8am and 6pm.

Results
The Democrats, Call to Australia, and Natural Law, who contested the previous election and gained 9.7 percent, 2.6 percent, and 1.9 percent respectively, did not contest the by-election. Labor won the seat from the Liberals.

See also
List of South Australian state by-elections

References

South Australian state by-elections
Torrens state by-election
1990s in South Australia
Torrens state by-election